Timothy Blair Pardee,  (December 11, 1830 – July 21, 1889) was an Ontario lawyer and political figure. He represented the riding of Lambton in the Legislative Assembly of Ontario from 1867 to 1874 and Lambton West from 1875 to 1889 as a Liberal.

He was born in Grenville County in Upper Canada in 1830. After his studies, he began articling in the law office of William Buell Richards, but, in 1849, he joined the California Gold Rush. A few years later, he headed off to the Victorian Gold Rush in Australia. Finally, he returned to Canada, articled in Sarnia and was called to the bar in 1861. He was appointed crown attorney in Lambton County but resigned in 1867 to run for a seat in the provincial parliament. In October 1872, he became provincial secretary in Oliver Mowat's cabinet. In December 1873, he was named Commissioner of Crown Lands. He became a Queen's Counsel in 1876. In 1878, he introduced an Act to Prevent the Forests from Destruction by Fire, the first forest protection legislation for the province. He resigned in January 1889 due to ill health.

He died in Sarnia later that year.

His son Frederick Forsyth later served in the Canadian House of Commons.

References

External links
Biography at the Dictionary of Canadian Biography Online

1830 births
1889 deaths
Canadian King's Counsel
Ontario Liberal Party MPPs
People from Lambton County
Provincial Secretaries of Ontario